Coula edulis is a tree in the genus Coula, native to tropical western Africa from Sierra Leone to Angola. It is plentiful in the Democratic Republic of Congo, Nigeria and Sierra Leone. It prefers tropical regions and is tolerant of light shade. It can be found in the top canopy of forest as well as the lower story and has no special soil requirements.

It is an evergreen tree growing to a height of 25–38 m, and has a dense crown that can cast deep shade. The leaves are arranged alternately, simple, 10–30 cm long and 4 cm broad, with an entire margin and an acuminate apex. The flowers are produced from April to June, and are greenish yellow, with either four or five petals.

The nut is an ellipsoidal drupe available from August to January, 3–4 cm long, with flesh surrounding the kernel, 5–6 mm thick, smooth in texture and can be red or green. The kernel shell is extremely hard and makes germination difficult. The nuts are usually found under the mother trees.

Common names include Gabon nut and African walnut. It is not related to the walnut, being so named because its nuts bear a superficial resemblance to the walnut.

Local names
Anamemila, Apopo, Sida in Nigeria
Bombulu in Zaire
Dibetou in Gabon and Ivory Coast
Mpengwa in Ghana
Dialect names
Akiouhia in Tchaman
Atsan in Atié
Bogüe in Agni
Howôtou  in Oubi
Ouatou in Kroumen
Séatou or Sratou in Guéré

Uses
Every part of the tree is used in both raw and finished states. Its timber and nuts are used extensively. The bark is used locally to produce rinses or enemas for loin pains or kidney problems. The wood is used to make pilings for bridges and railway ties in addition to charcoal and standard construction.

Nuts
The nut is 50% fat of which 87% is oleic acid. The flavour is mild and is said to be between the flavour of hazelnuts and chestnuts. Used in a variety of ways it can be boiled, roasted and fermented before being eaten. The nuts can be used in recipes and mixed with meats. It is also a source of cooking oil and ground flour. The nut is a favoured food item of chimpanzees, though the tough shell necessitates the use of a rock as hammer to gain access to the kernel.

References

Davidson, Alan.  Oxford Companion to Food (1999). Gabon Nut, p. 328.
Agro Forestry Database: Coula edulis

Edible nuts and seeds
Flora of West Tropical Africa
Trees of Africa
Olacaceae
Taxa named by Henri Ernest Baillon
Plants described in 1862